Circle of Hope Girls' Ranch was a reformatory boarding school located in Humansville, Missouri. The school opened in July 2006 and was closed in 2020 amid reports and lawsuits filed by former students alleging child abuse, as well as due to an investigation conducted by the Missouri State Highway Patrol. 

Before the school's closure, parents, former students, and staff filed multiple reports to state authorities, but to no avail. Federal prosecutors refused to file charges after a 2018 report by the Missouri State Highway Patrol regarding child abuse at the ranch, and prosecutors in Missouri also refused to file charges after another report the year before. Former students have alleged that Missouri's Department of Social Services largely ignored their reports regarding the ranch.

As part of an investigation involving various state agencies, including the Cedar County Sheriff's Department, "at least 24" students were removed by local child protective services in August 2020.

Boyd and Stephanie Householder were arrested and brought into state custody on March 9, 2021. After Boyd Householder indicated that he had developed COVID-19 and Stephanie Householder had blood clots in her right foot, they were released on a $10,000 bail and sentenced to house confinement in July 2021.

History 
Circle of Hope Girls' Ranch opened in July 2006. The owner of the ranch, Boyd Householder, is a Vietnam War veteran who had previously worked at reform schools in Missouri and Florida, including the Agape Boarding School, which is currently under investigation by the Missouri State Highway Patrol.

Program 
Religious teaching through the Bible was a core part of the program; their website stated that their purpose was to "use the Bible to teach [young women] that they are to obey their parents and the authority over them". Residents spent much of their day doing manual labor, such as working outside and cleaning the house. Their clothes were allowed to be changed twice a week. Educational material consisted of packets from the home-school provider Accelerated Christian Education. The educational aspect of the program often did not count towards credits in other school districts. Residents were required to stay at the ranch for at least 2 years. The program permitted 15-minute calls and letters with parents; however, former residents stated that communication was heavily censored.

Reporting of abuse 
Allegations of abuse at the ranch were first made known about a year after it opened in 2006. Parents, former students, and staff filed multiple reports to state authorities, but to no avail. Federal prosecutors refused to file charges after a 2018 report by the Missouri State Highway Patrol regarding child abuse at the ranch, and prosecutors in Missouri also refused to file charges after another report the year before. Former students have alleged that their experiences with the ranch were largely ignored by Missouri's Department of Social Services. The ranch largely evaded detection by authorities due to a law that protected faith-based schools from the requirement of basic oversight. 

Starting in 2020, the ranch started to gain wider media attention due to former residents using social media to talk about their experiences at the ranch. Among those who spoke out against the ranch is Amanda Householder, the daughter of Boyd and Stephanie Householder, who are the owners of the ranch. Amanda set up a TikTok account in May carrying the bio: “My parents own an abusive boarding school for girls. This is my page exposing it.” Videos by Amanda and former residents describing abuse at the ranch amassed more than 33 million views — and finally prompted action.

Investigations were also launched by the Kansas City Star and the Cedar County Republican, both local newspapers in Missouri.

Yelp Contribution To Hiding Abuse

Almost 100 complaints against Circle of Hope were removed from Yelp starting in 2018.

Lawsuits 
Multiple lawsuits were filed against the ranch in September 2020 by former residents. These residents alleged, among other things, that they had been raped, molested, denied food and water, handcuffed, chained, and forced to stand in front of a wall for hours on end.

In July 2021, four of these lawsuits were settled. The amounts that the plaintiffs settled for are reportedly confidential.

In March 2022, Amanda sued her parents, along with other parties, alleging that her parents made her perform forced labor, beat her, and forced her to punish other students.

In August 2022, Oklahoma woman and former student Maggie Drew sued the Householders and other parties, including Agape Boarding School and the Agape Baptist Church. She alleges that they committed sex trafficking.

Closure and aftermath 

"At least 24" students were removed by local child protective services in August 2020 as part of an investigation involving several state agencies, including the Cedar County Sheriff's Department. In September 2020, Boyd Householder stated to the Kansas City Star that the ranch was "closed for good" and also stated that he and his wife Stephanie were going to try and "vindicate themselves". The properties that were part of the ranch were put up for sale the same month.

The Householders have denied ever abusing a student. They have stated that the allegations against them are false and that they were created by former residents "whose lives didn't turn out the way they wanted after they left the ranch". The Householders' attorney, Jay Kirksey, stated to the Cedar County Republican that the allegations were from "young women who have troubled pasts, who have biases [and] prejudices [and] who have no credibility".

In 2021, representatives Rudy Veit and Keri Ingle introduced Missouri House bills 557 and 560, which requires private faith-based facilities and schools to have basic oversight. The bill also requires employees to have background checks, regular inspections for health and safety, and requires schools to notify authorities that it is operating in the state. Testimony about the bill was heard in February and April 2021. Among the speakers were former residents of the ranch. The bill passed unanimously in the House and in the Missouri Senate.

In February 2021, the ranch was covered on the Dateline NBC episode "Broken Circle".

Legal proceedings 
On March 9, 2021, Boyd and Stephanie Householder were taken into state custody. The Missouri Attorney General's office announced that Boyd is being charged with 79 felony counts and 1 misdemeanor, including charges for child molestation and sodomy. Stephanie was also charged with 22 felony counts; all for child abuse and neglect. They pled not guilty during their first court appearance. Eric Schmitt, Missouri's Attorney General, stated that the Circle of Hope case is “one of the most widespread cases of sexual, physical and mental abuse patterns against young girls and women in Missouri history”. The Householders maintain their innocence, and their defense attorney Adam Woody petitioned for them to be released on bond, stating that they are "very good people ... [with] outstanding reputations and spotless records". On June 14, 2021, judge David R. Munton denied their initial bond request. Their bond hearing was held in the Vernon County Circuit Court in the city of Nevada, as the Householders moved after the closure of Circle of Hope.

The Householders faced a judge for a preliminary hearing on May 20, 2021. During the hearing, prosecutors shared details from their interviews with former residents. 

As of July 2022, they are now out on a $10,000 bond and sentenced to home confinement, after Boyd Householder reportedly stated that he had contracted COVID-19, and that Stephanie Householder had blood clots in her right foot. Former residents expressed disgust at the decision; the Householders' daughter Amanda stated that it made her "sick to [her] stomach". Attorney General Schmitt also criticized their release, stating that it was the responsibility of the Cedar County jail administrator to find another facility to hold them instead of releasing them.

In September 2021, the couple asked for their home confinement to be eased so that they could drive to Walmart. They also asked to be able to go to church. These requests were denied.

The Householders' trial is scheduled for November 27 to December 15, 2023.

References 

Boarding schools in Missouri
Private high schools in Missouri
Educational institutions established in 2006
Educational institutions disestablished in 2020
Christian schools in Missouri
Child abuse incidents and cases
Incidents of violence against girls
Girls' schools in Missouri